Elise Burgin and Pam Shriver were the defending champions but they competed with different partners that year, Burgin with Robin White and Shriver with Martina Navratilova.

Burgin and White lost in the quarterfinals to Larisa Savchenko and Natasha Zvereva.

Navratilova and Shriver won in the final 6–3, 6–4 against Gabriela Sabatini and Helena Suková.

Seeds
Champion seeds are indicated in bold text while text in italics indicates the round in which those seeds were eliminated.

 Martina Navratilova /  Pam Shriver (champions)
 Gabriela Sabatini /  Helena Suková (quarterfinals)
 Zina Garrison /  Gigi Fernández (first round)
 Elise Burgin /  Robin White (quarterfinals)

Draw

References
 1988 Virginia Slims of Washington Doubles Draw

Virginia Slims of Washington
1988 WTA Tour